is a passenger railway station in located in the city of Kōka,  Shiga Prefecture, Japan, operated by the private railway operator Ohmi Railway.

Lines
Minakuchi Jōnan Station is served by the Ohmi Railway Main Line, and is located 45.1 rail kilometers from the terminus of the line at Maibara Station.

Station layout
The station consists of one side platform serving a single bi-directional track. The station building is a two-story wooden structure, which is staffed during daytime hours.

Platforms

Adjacent stations

History
Minakuchi Jōnan Station was opened on April 5, 1989.

Passenger statistics
In fiscal 2018, the station was used by an average of 534 passengers daily.

Surroundings
 Koka City Office
 Minakuchi Post Office
 Koka City Mizuguchi Library
 Shiga Prefectural Mizuguchi High School

See also
List of railway stations in Japan

References

External links

 Ohmi Railway official site 

Railway stations in Shiga Prefecture
Railway stations in Japan opened in 1989
Kōka, Shiga